E3 ubiquitin-protein ligase UBR5 is an enzyme that in humans is encoded by the UBR5 gene.

Function 

This gene encodes a progestin-induced protein, which belongs to the HECT (homology to E6-AP carboxyl terminus) family. The HECT family proteins function as E3 ubiquitin-protein ligases, targeting specific proteins for ubiquitin-mediated proteolysis. This gene is localized to chromosome 8q22 which is disrupted in a variety of cancers. This gene potentially has a role in regulation of cell proliferation or differentiation.

Interactions 

UBR5 has been shown to interact with:
 CIB1, 
 Karyopherin alpha 1,
 MAPK1,  and
 TOPBP1.

References

Further reading

External links 
Ubr5 : Protein Overview : UCSD-Nature Molecule Pages